The 2020–21 Le Havre AC season was the club's 127th season in existence and its seventh consecutive season in the second flight of French football. In addition to the domestic league, Le Havre participated in this season's edition of the Coupe de France. The season covered the period from 1 July 2020 to 30 June 2021.

Players

First-team squad

Out on loan

Pre-season and friendlies

Competitions

Overview

Ligue 2

League table

Results summary

Results by round

Matches
The league fixtures were announced on 9 July 2020.

Coupe de France

References

External links

Le Havre AC seasons
Le Havre AC